Citizen in Space is a collection of science fiction short stories by American writer Robert Sheckley. It was first published in 1955 by Ballantine Books (catalogue number 126).

Contents
The book includes the following stories (magazines in which the stories originally appeared given in parentheses):

"The Mountain Without a Name" (1955)
 "The Accountant" (The Magazine of Fantasy & Science Fiction, July 1954)
 "Hunting Problem" (Galaxy, September 1955)
 "A Thief in Time" (Galaxy, July 1954)
 "The Luckiest Man in the World" (Fantastic Universe 1955/2; also known as "Fortunate Person")
 "Hands Off" (Galaxy, April 1954)
 "Something for Nothing" (Galaxy, June 1954)
 "A Ticket to Tranai" (Galaxy, October 1955)
 "The Battle" (If, September 1954)
 "Skulking Permit" (Galaxy, December 1954)
 "Citizen in Space" (Playboy September 1955; also known as "Spy Story")
 "Ask a Foolish Question" (Science Fiction Stories No. 1, 1953)

Reception
Galaxy reviewer Floyd C. Gale praised the stories as "very high in inventiveness, ingenuity and reader appeal."

References

External links

1955 short story collections
Short story collections by Robert Sheckley
Ballantine Books books
American short story collections